Bak Seon-yeong (Hangul: 박선영; born February 1970, 2, 8) is a South Korean voice actress who joined the Munhwa Broadcasting Corporation's voice acting division in 1997, she was voiced Kang Lim's mother in Tooniverse's The Haunted House series.

Roles

Broadcast TV
 (Tooniverse original network) - Kang Lim's mother

Dubbing

Movies
Election (1999 film) (replacing Reese Witherspoon, Korea TV Edition, MBC)
Vanilla Sky (replacing Cameron Diaz, Korea TV Edition, MBC)
Meltdown (replacing Chingmy Yau, Korea TV Edition, MBC)
Double Jeopardy (film) (replacing Annabeth Gish, Korea TV Edition, MBC)
Derailed (extra guest, Korea TV Edition, MBC)
The Butterfly Effect (replacing Amy Smart, Korea TV Edition, MBC)
About a Boy (film) (replacing Rachel Weisz, Korea TV Edition, MBC)
Six Days Seven Nights (replacing Anne Heche, Korea TV Edition, MBC)
Pirates of the Caribbean: The Curse of the Black Pearl (replacing Keira Knightley, Korea TV Edition, MBC)
The Italian Job (2003 film) (replacing Charlize Theron, Korea TV Edition, MBC)
Sky Captain and the World of Tomorrow (replacing Gwyneth Paltrow, Korea TV Edition, MBC)

Television
The Melancholy of Haruhi Suzumiya (Haruhi Suzumiya)
Hannah Montana (Disney Channel) (Lilly Truscott)
Iron Kid (KBS)
Ojamajo Doremi (Magical Remi from 1st - 3rd Series, Korea TV Edition, MBC and 4th series Korea TV Edition, Tooniverse)
The Powerpuff Girls (Cartoon Network) (Blossom)
24 (replacing Reiko Aylesworth by season 2, Korea TV Edition, MBC)
Jimmy Neutron (Korea TV Edition, MBC)
Ragnarok The Animation (Korea TV Edition, SBS)
Shadow Fighter (MBC)
Bikkuriman (Bumerang Fighter, Korea TV Edition, MBC)
¡Vivan los niños! (Korea TV Edition, SBS)
CSI: Crime Scene Investigation (replacing Louise Lombard by Season 6, Korea TV Edition, MBC)

Games
 Getcha Ghost-Shinbi - Kang Lim's mother

Awards
2011 MBC Drama Awards: Best TV Voice Actress

See also
Munhwa Broadcasting Corporation
MBC Voice Acting Division
Tooniverse

Homepage
Daum Cafe Voice Actor Bak Seon Yeong Fan Cafe (in Korean)
MBC Voice Acting division Bak Seon Yeong Blog (in Korean)

1970 births
Living people
South Korean voice actresses
Place of birth missing (living people)